Counselor-in-Training (CIT) at a summer camp can be both a person’s designation and a program intended to prepare people to become counselors. CIT programs vary in detail, but all have elements in common.

Common elements
 Virtually all programs require familiarity with the normal activities that participants engage in by attending at least one session as a participant prior to becoming a CIT. 
 If that is impossible or impractical, a training course may be held with the CITs acting as participants under the supervision of a CIT Trainer, who takes the "students" through the normal camp routines while demonstrating and discussing effective leadership techniques/skills in communication, group management, decision-making, and conflict management.
 The duration of the training may be as short as a weekend, several weeks, or an entire summer.
 After formal training, many programs require CITs to be assigned for a time period to an experienced counselor to assist and learn during sessions with campers. In other programs, the CITs stay together as a unit but are assigned during the day to help other camp staff, assist with special events, and participate in a service project.
 The CIT is evaluated by his trainer(s) and peers based on attitude, communication, values & character, program support, team building, and leadership style.
 Camps for older teens may allow regular attendees to follow a CIT apprenticeship curriculum by taking on extra responsibilities in exchange for benefits and privileges. They may or may not receive discounted tuition.
 Overnight camps may be subject to state law which requires counselors to be legal adults when supervising minors. Where that requirement exists, CITs are usually 16 or 17 years old, and junior CITs are 14 or 15. If a person is still under the legal age after successfully completing the CIT program, a camp may hire them as a Junior Counselor for specific duties. 
 For Day camps, some organizations have Junior CIT programs for 12–13 year old. and CIT programs after age 13.

History
The first CIT program began at Yawgoog Scout Reservation in 1953. Up until 2017, the CIT corps served as a way to prepare Boy Scouts to be Yawgoog Staffmen. In 2018, it was replaced by the Yawgoog Leadership Experience or YLE for short. The program removed morning PT and much of the militarization of the corps.

Guidelines
In order to be an effective counselor, guidelines help maximize the training experience:

1. Prepare for the job; research and practice activities you are unfamiliar, with including certification in First Aid/CPR.
2. Understand your responsibilities and embrace them.
3. Pay attention during training and ask questions.
4. Make friends with other staff, so everybody gets along.
5. Become familiar with camp support groups and what they do: kitchen, medical, maintenance, etc. 
6. Memorize the daily schedule. 
7. Learn and use the first names of those in your group.
8. Spend time with each team member and determine their personality type.  
9. Teambuild before members compete against each other.
10. Get feedback from your team members daily and adjust subsequent activities. 
11. Use your time wisely, especially free time.

In popular culture 
Courtney, a character in the popular Canadian animated reality comedy, Total Drama, is known to frequently mention her time as a CIT, much to the ire of other contestants.

See also
Camping (recreational activity)
Outdoor education
List of summer camps
Wikibooks: How to be a Good Camp Counselor

References

Summer camps